Sir Thomas Hilbourne Frank (6 December 1931 - 29 March 2020) was a politician from Antigua and Barbuda. He was a political leader of the Barbuda People's Movement, which favours greater independence of Barbuda from Antigua and supports the United Progressive Party.

He served as Chairman of the Barbuda Council on two occasions – from 1979 to 1985 and from 1989 to 1997. He also served as Barbuda's sole member of the House of Representatives of Antigua and Barbuda between 1989 and 2004. In 2004, he retired as a legislator; he was knighted later that year.

He died on March 29, 2020 at age 88, in Codrington, Barbuda.

References

Antigua and Barbuda knights
1932 births
2020 deaths
Chairs of the Barbuda Council
Members of the Barbuda Council
Barbuda People's Movement politicians
People from Barbuda
Members of the House of Representatives (Antigua and Barbuda)